A showpiece is:

 An accomplishment which is worthy of display and admiration:
 English Wikipedia's 1,000,000th qualified article,  Jordanhill railway station, was called a "showpiece of parallel collaboration."

 An outstanding example of a type:
 Beacon Hill Park in Victoria, British Columbia is considered a showpiece garden.
 The Green Mountain College organic garden with many heirloom plantings has become a campus showpiece.
 A performance or composition which provides an opportunity for the display of a particular skill:
 The Dying Swan was ballerina Anna Pavlova's showpiece.
 Luciano Berio's Sequenza XII is a showpiece for bassoon.
 A work of art or theatrical production presented for exhibition:
 In 1994, choreographer Jerome Robbins created a showpiece for the School of American Ballet based on composer Johann Sebastian Bach's Two and Three Part Inventions. 
 In the satiric sense, a showpiece is a charade, a mockery, an empty or absurd pretense.

See also
 Pièce de résistance
 Showcase (disambiguation)

References

The arts